Flavobacterium denitrificans is a species of N2O-producing facultative aerobic bacteria first isolated from the gut of the earthworm Aporrectodea caliginosa. It is a Gram-negative, motile rod with type strain ED5T (=DSM 15936T =ATCC BAA-842T).

References

External links
LPSN
Type strain of Flavobacterium denitrificans at BacDive -  the Bacterial Diversity Metadatabase

denitrificans
Bacteria described in 2005